Edesa S.A is a Spanish manufacturer of domestic and commercial appliances. After 60 years, it became a popular product in other countries. It is currently one of the top five brands in Spain in its sector.

Product range 
Edesa produces kitchen appliances, such as ovens, cookers, refrigerators and its biggest product, washing machines and tumble dryers. In 2008 it created four brands of ranges,  Romantic, Pop Collection, Sports Collection and Metallic.

History 
The Edesa brand was created in 1941. The brand had had a successful record, and in 1989 became part of Fagor. It is now part of the CNA Group.

References

External links 
Edesa

Home appliance brands
Manufacturing companies based in Barcelona
Manufacturing companies established in 1941
Cooking appliance brands
Spanish brands
1941 establishments in Spain